Lasha Dekanosidze (born 9 July 1987) is a Georgian former professional football player.

External links
 
 

1987 births
Living people
Footballers from Georgia (country)
Association football defenders
Expatriate footballers from Georgia (country)
Expatriate footballers in Belarus
Expatriate footballers in Finland
FC BATE Borisov players
FC Spartaki Tskhinvali players
FC Torpedo-BelAZ Zhodino players
FC Merani Martvili players
Kajaanin Haka players